Noelia Garcia Martin (born 20 April 1973 in Plasencia, Cáceres) is an S6 swimmer from Spain.   Her physical disability is the result of a problem with doctors and a blood clot that occurred in her bone after she had surgery on her knee. She competed at the 2004 Summer Paralympics, winning a silver in the 4 x 50 meter medley relay 20 points race.

References 

Living people
1973 births
Spanish female breaststroke swimmers
Spanish female freestyle swimmers
Paralympic silver medalists for Spain
Swimmers at the 2004 Summer Paralympics
Paralympic medalists in swimming
Medalists at the 2004 Summer Paralympics
Paralympic swimmers of Spain
People from Plasencia
Sportspeople from the Province of Cáceres
21st-century Spanish women